The Union of Metallurgical and Mining Workers was a trade union representing workers in two related industries in Yugoslavia.

The union was founded in 1955, when the Union of Metallurgical Workers and Employees merged with the Union of Mining Workers.  Like both its predecessors, it affiliated to the Confederation of Trade Unions of Yugoslavia.  On formation, it had 127,940 members, and was led by Nikola Kotle.

On 18 April 1959, it merged with the Union of Chemical Industry Workers, to form the Union of Mining, Metallurgical and Chemical Workers.

References

Mining trade unions
Trade unions established in 1955
Trade unions disestablished in 1959
Trade unions in Yugoslavia